Cylichnidia ovuliformis is a species of land snail in the family Ferussaciidae. It is endemic to Madeira, where it is known only from Porto Santo Island.

The snail has been recorded at five sites on mountain slopes on the island. It lives on the ground, often under rocks, logs, and leaf litter. In some places it is threatened by habitat disturbance from nearby plantations.

References

Ferussaciidae
Molluscs of Madeira
Endemic fauna of Madeira
Porto Santo Island
Gastropods described in 1831
Taxonomy articles created by Polbot